The  Project for Good Information (PGI) is an American group founded by Democratic strategist, Tara McGowan. 

Its stated purpose is to combat disinformation and misinformation online by promoting verified traditional media outlets and has called for the regulation of social media platforms to combat misinformation. 

The project includes forming a 501(c)(3) organization called the Good Information Project, which will grant money to non-profit media companies, and a public benefit corporation called Good Information Inc., which will invest in for-profit media companies. The Good Information Inc. has high-profile billionaire backers, such as Reid Hoffman and George Soros.

See also
Acronym (organization)
Fake news
Fake news website

References 

Disinformation
Communication of falsehoods
Propaganda techniques
Organizations established in 2021